

The Ukrainian Canadian Civil Liberties Association (UCCLA) ( (AU-CDC)) is a Ukrainian organization in Canada. Established in 1986 after the Civil Liberties Commission (affiliated with the Ukrainian Canadian Congress) was disbanded, its members – all of whom are volunteers – have been particularly active in championing the cause of recognition, restitution and reconciliation with respect to Canada's first national internment operations, helping secure a redress settlement in 2008 with the Government of Canada along with the Ukrainian Canadian Congress and the Taras Shevchenko Foundation. They have also challenged unfounded allegations about the supposed presence of "Nazi war criminals" hiding in Canada, and documented the presence of veterans of the NKVD, SMERSH, and KGB in Canada. The first chairman of the CLC/UCCLA was John B. Gregorovich, a lawyer. The current chairman is Roman Zakaluzny; the immediate past president was Lubomyr Luciuk.

UCCLA's members meet annually during conclaves held in different cities across the country, often co-ordinating their meeting dates with the unveiling of trilingual historical markers commemorating the internment operations at different camp locations or otherwise recalling important individuals or events in Ukrainian and Ukrainian Canadian history. The association and its supporters have also placed two dozen trilingual markers and four statues across Canada, in Ukraine and in France honouring the Ukrainian Canadian Victoria Cross recipient, Cpl Filip Konowal; recalling the contributions of Ukrainian Canadian servicemen and women during the Second World War (London, England); and honouring the Welsh journalist, Gareth Jones, reported on the famine of 1932–33. UCCLA has also commissioned a number of articles and books that have been distributed internationally dealing with the famine, Anglo-American perspectives on the question of Ukraine's independence, the Ukrainian nationalist movement before, during and after the Second World War, and Soviet military operations. In 2003–2004, UCCLA campaigned to have the 1932 Pulitzer Prize of Walter Duranty, the New York Times correspondent in Moscow from 1922 to 1934, revoked. Duranty wrote in 1933, during the Great Famine, that "there was no famine" and criticized articles by other Western journalists as "failed predictions of doom for the Soviets".

In 2010 UCCLA strove to ensure that all 12 galleries in the publicly funded Canadian Museum for Human Rights were thematic, comparative and inclusive – rather than elevating the suffering of any one or two communities above all others. To that end the association distributed thousands of protest postcards nationally and published a notice raising their concerns in The Hill Times (31 January 2011). Some of UCCLA's critics have tried to censure or even call for the silencing of its voice in the public debate over the proposed contents and governance of the tax payer funded Canadian Museum for Human Rights. One of UCCLA's other recent campaigns (February 2016) involved an appeal to the then-Minister of Canadian Heritage, the Honourable Mélanie Joly, requesting her intervention to help save and re-consecrate the internment camp cemetery at Spirit Lake (La Ferme), Quebec. That internee cemetery remains abandoned and in ever-deteriorating condition, despite being a unique Canadian historical site.

UCCLA continues to be a volunteer organization supported by the donations and efforts of thousands of Canadians of Ukrainian heritage.

UCCLA-supported publications
Some of the books and pamphlets published with the support of the UCCLA include:

 Lubomyr Luciuk, Operation Payback: Soviet Disinformation and Alleged Nazi War Criminals in Canada (Kashtan Press, 2022)
 
 
 Lubomyr Luciuk and Ron Sorobey, Konowal: A Canadian Hero (Kingston, Ont.: Kashtan Press, 2000)

See also

References

Sources

 
 
 
 
 
 
  (Internment booklet)
 
 
 
 
 
 
 Lubomyr Luciuk and Ron Sorobey, Konowal: A Canadian Hero (Kingston, Ont.: Kashtan Press, 2000)
 
 
 
 Redressing history's horrors.(Enemy aliens, Prisoners of War and In Fear of the Barbed Wire Fence; bibliography). The Beaver: Exploring Canada's History 83.2 (April–May 2003): p54(2). (1112 words)

External links
 
 Website of the Canadian First World War Internment Recognition Fund
 UCCLA News blog

Ukrainian diaspora in Canada
Civil liberties advocacy groups
Human rights organizations based in Canada
Ethnic organizations based in Canada
Ukrainian diaspora organizations
1986 establishments in Canada
Civic and political organizations of Canada